The Speckled Band is a 1910 play in three acts by Sir Arthur Conan Doyle, based on his own 1892 short story "The Adventure of the Speckled Band".

Background
In 1909, Conan Doyle had leased the Adelphi Theatre at his own expense for a production of a boxing drama entitled The House of Temperley which was an adaptation of his novel Rodney Stone. While the play was initially a success, the death of King Edward VII caused West End theatres to close for a month in mourning The closing spelled the demise of the play. To recoup his loses and do something with an empty theatre he had leased, Conan Doyle decided to stage a new play. Keeping in mind that William Gillette had achieved great success with his play Sherlock Holmes, which was based on an earlier Conan Doyle script, Conan Doyle wrote his own Sherlock Holmes play in a week.

Conan Doyle made some alterations to the names of his characters, with Roylott becoming Rylott, and Julia Stoner becoming Violet Stoner.

Casting

Conan Doyle hired an actor with a great deal of experience as Sherlock Holmes; H. A. Saintsbury had toured the Gillette play and was on the verge of his 1,000th performance in the role. Lyn Harding was cast to play Dr. Rylott and also direct the play, a decision Conan Doyle quickly came to regret. Over the course of many rehearsals, Harding slowly transformed the character into a more idiosyncratic character which infuriated Conan Doyle. Harding desired for Rylott to be more central to the story whereas Conan Doyle wanted less of his presence. J. M. Barrie was invited to view the rehearsals and provide an opinion as he was friends with both Harding and Conan Doyle. Harding's interpretation carried the day with Barrie saying "Let Harding have his own way."

Production
The play premiered on 4 June 1910. The play was an immediate success and Harding's performance was adored by critics. Proven wrong, Conan Doyle sent Harding a letter of congratulations. Over time, Conan Doyle came to appreciate Harding's performance.

The snake used in performances was less appreciated.

The Speckled Band ran for 169 performances at the Adelphi Theatre before enjoying a successful tour in England and the continent.

Autumn of 1910 brought the production to Boston, Massachusetts and later New York City, New York with Harding continuing in as Rylott but Holmes recast with Charles Millward taking the role.

Cast 
 H. A. Saintsbury as Sherlock Holmes
 Lyn Harding as Dr Grimesby Rylott
 Claude King as Doctor Watson
Christine Silver as Enid Stoner

Revivals
In 1914, the Chicago, Illinois production cast H. Cooper Cliffe in the role of Holmes with Harding continuing as Rylott. There was a London revival in 1921 with H. A. Saintsbury returning to the role of Holmes.

Film adaptation
The play was adapted to film in 1931 as The Speckled Band with Lyn Harding repeating his role as Dr. Grimesby Rylott and starring Raymond Massey as Sherlock Holmes.

References

Sources

1910 plays
Works based on Sherlock Holmes
Works by Arthur Conan Doyle